The 2018 WAFF U-18 Women's Championship was the 1st edition of the WAFF U-18 Women's Championship, the international women's football youth championship of Western Asia organised by the West Asian Football Federation (WAFF). It was held in Bhamdoun, Lebanon from 28 August to 1 September 2018. The tournament was won by Jordan, with Lebanon coming in second place and Palestine in third place.

Teams
Three teams entered the tournament.

Group stage

Champions

Statistics

Goalscorers

References

External links
 2018 WAFF U-18 Women's Championship at Goalzz.com

U18 2018
WAFF U18
WAFF U18